India toured the West Indies during the 2006 international cricket season. India were ranked highly above the West Indies in both the ICC Test Championship as well as the ICC ODI Championship but the latter team had the favour of beating Zimbabwe 5–0 in a series of One Day International matches earlier in the month. West Indies eventually emerged as winners of this ODI series, taking it 4–1 after losing the first match in the final over.

India had not won a Test series in the West Indies for 35 years, but India defeated the West Indies 1–0 in the Test series.  Rahul Dravid, the Indian squad captain, was awarded the Man of the Series award for his performance.

Former West Indian fast bowler and commentator, Michael Holding, said between the ODIs and Tests that the West Indies ODI series win was an event that "nobody had foreseen".

Schedule

Squads

Players were selected for both ODIs and Tests unless otherwise specified.

One-Day Matches

Tour Match (16 May)
Indians 7/289 (50) def Jamaica 173 (45) by 116 runs.

First ODI

India won the toss and captain Rahul Dravid elected to field first, after five overs were cut off each side's innings due to heavy overnight rain. West Indies hit 251 runs for 6 wickets, with Chris Gayle contributing nearly half the total, 123, before he was out with five overs remaining to Ajit Agarkar, who got the most wickets for India, claiming two for 38. However, India also had an opener contributing a century, with Rahul Dravid bringing up his hundred in 99 balls, eventually ending with 105 off 102. Dravid paired up with Mohammad Kaif to add 123 for the fourth wicket, before Dwayne Bravo had Dravid caught, leaving India with 43 to get from the last 37 balls; with two fours and a six from Mahendra Singh Dhoni, and Kaif hitting 16 off his last 16 deliveries, India made it to the target with a ball to spare.

Second ODI

India won the toss and captain Rahul Dravid elected to field first, looking for his 18th continuous win batting second, but it was not to be his day as Dwayne Bravo delivered a "clever slower ball" which went through Yuvraj Singh's wicket, leaving him bowled and India all out for 197 needing 199 to win.

West Indies lost both openers with one run, sending Brian Lara in to bat with Ramnaresh Sarwan. Captain Lara was caught off Pathan for 14, however, which was to be the fourth-highest total of West Indies' innings. The second-highest was 21, from Carlton Baugh, but due to an unbeaten 98 from Ramnaresh Sarwan, which later resulted in Man of the Match honours, the West Indies' total read 198 for nine, with Sarwan and Jerome Taylor adding 34 off 20 balls for the ninth wicket before Fidel Edwards scored the final run of the innings.

In reply, India started better than West Indies, making 37 for the first two wickets, which were catches off Ian Bradshaw's bowling. Two more wickets followed, with Fidel Edwards and Jerome Taylor picking up one each, but at 60 for four in the 17th over, India were still 17 ahead of West Indies' score for the same number of wickets. Then, like in the West Indian innings, the fifth-wicket stand was the highest of the game. However, the 64 runs came at a rate of 3.49 an over, somewhat short of the required four to win, and after Suresh Raina's dismissal Dhoni and Agarkar followed within the next three overs.

India now had three wickets in hand and 64 to get, but Ramesh Powar batted for eight overs together with Yuvraj Singh, as the pair cut 43 off the total, Powar contributing 12. Powar was caught off Marlon Samuels' bowling, however, as the spinner picked up his second wicket, and Chris Gayle then held a return catch off Harbhajan Singh two overs later. That left India with 12 runs to get off 10 balls; the remainder of Gayle's over went for one run, and India needed eleven off the last over, which was to be bowled by Dwayne Bravo (who had only bowled three of the 49 previous overs). Munaf Patel faced the first ball, got it away for a single, before Yuvraj Singh hit two fours to leave himself with two runs to get off three balls, only to be clean bowled off the last delivery.

Third ODI

Fourth ODI

Fifth ODI

Tour match

Two-day: Antigua and Barbuda v Indians

Test series

First Test

Second Test

Third Test

Fourth Test

References

External links
 Tour home at ESPNcricinfo
 

2006 in Indian cricket
2006 in West Indian cricket
2006
West Indian cricket seasons from 2000–01
International cricket competitions in 2006